Kim Hyung-il  (born 27 April 1984) is a South Korean footballer who currently plays as defender for Navy.

Career
In March 2009, he was selected for the South Korea national football team. On 3 June 2009, he played at first senior level game against Oman national football team.

On 24 December 2016, Kim joined Chinese Super League champions Guangzhou Evergrande on a half-year contract for free transfer. He left Guangzhou in June 2017 without playing any match for the club.

Kim joined K League 2 side Bucheon FC 1995 on 29 June 2017.

After retiring from football, Kim signed with DH Entertainment.

Club career statistics

Honours

Club
Pohang Steelers
 K League 1 (1) : 2013
 Korean FA Cup (1) : 2008
 K-League Cup (1) : 2009
 AFC Champions League (1) : 2009

Sangju Sangmu Phoenix
 K League 2 (1) : 2013

Jeonbuk Hyundai Motors
 K League 1 (1) : 2015
 AFC Champions League (1) : 2016

Individual
Pohang Steelers
 K-League Best XI (1) : 2009
Sangju Sangmu Phoenix
 K League Challenge Best 11 (1) : 2013

References

External links
 
 National Team Player Record 
 
 
 

1984 births
Living people
Association football defenders
South Korean footballers
South Korea international footballers
Daejeon Hana Citizen FC players
Pohang Steelers players
Gimcheon Sangmu FC players
Jeonbuk Hyundai Motors players
Guangzhou F.C. players
K League 2 players
K League 1 players
Chinese Super League players
South Korean expatriate sportspeople in China
Expatriate footballers in China
2010 FIFA World Cup players
Sportspeople from Incheon